Ken Harbaugh (born December 15, 1973) is a former United States Navy pilot and nonprofit executive. Harbaugh was the Democratic Party nominee for the U.S. House of Representatives representing Ohio's 7th congressional district in the 2018 election.

Early life, education, and military service
Harbaugh, who grew up in a military family, earned a Bachelor of Science degree from Duke University in 1996 and a Juris Doctor degree from Yale Law School in 2008, and studied at Oxford University while an undergraduate at Duke. He served for nine years in the United States Navy as a naval aviator. His qualifications include Electronic Warfare Aircraft Commander, the lead pilot of an EP-3A Aries II electronic reconnaissance aircraft.

In 2015, Harbaugh wrote an opinion piece in The New York Times, criticizing what he regards as a lax VA disability compensation program.

Ken Harbaugh was the 2020 Hooah Award winner, given annually to an American veteran “who defines citizenship through service to our country, both in uniform and beyond.” His writing on civil-military affairs has appeared in The Atlantic, The New York Times, The Bulwark, and the Yale Journal of International Law. He served as a commentator for National Public Radio and as host for Crooked Media’s Reclaiming Patriotism. He currently hosts several podcasts, including Warriors in Their Own Words, and Burn the Boats, which received a 2021 Ambies nomination for best political podcast of the year.

Nonprofit career
In 2007, Harbaugh co-founded The Mission Continues, a nonprofit focusing on veterans issues, with Eric Greitens, who went on to become the Republican Governor of Missouri. The Mission Continues was chronicled in Joe Klein's book Charlie Mike, which detailed the efforts of Harbaugh, Greitens, and others to raise money for and then staff their organization.

He is the former president of Team Rubicon, a nonprofit that deploys military veterans worldwide as emergency first responders.

Personal life
Harbaugh and his wife, Annmarie, have two daughters and a son. In 2009, the family moved from Connecticut to Chagrin Falls, Ohio, and then moved to California in 2014. They moved back to Ohio in 2016, purchasing a home in Avon.

References 

Duke University alumni
Living people
Ohio Democrats
United States Naval Aviators
United States Navy officers
Yale Law School alumni
1973 births
Candidates in the 2018 United States elections